Robin Alta Charo (born 1958) is the Warren P. Knowles Professor of Law and Bioethics at the University of Wisconsin–Madison and a leading American authority on bioethics.  She holds appointments in both Wisconsin's law school and medical school.

Charo is among the leading advocates for embryonic stem cell research in the United States.

She earned a B.A. in biology from Harvard University in 1979 and a J.D. from Columbia University in 1982. She is a fellow of the Hastings Center, an independent bioethics research institution.

In 2020, the American Academy of Arts and Sciences elected her fellow.

References

External links
 Faculty page
 Biography at Center for American Progress
 

Bioethicists
Living people
1958 births
Harvard College alumni
Columbia Law School alumni
Hastings Center Fellows
American legal scholars
American ethicists
American women legal scholars
University of Wisconsin–Madison faculty
University of Wisconsin Law School faculty

Fellows of the American Academy of Arts and Sciences
Members of the National Academy of Medicine